Aske Sampers (born 20 May 2001) is a Belgian football player. He plays for Lierse.

Club career
He made his Belgian First Division A debut for Cercle Brugge on 31 July 2021 in a game against OH Leuven.

On 31 January 2023, Sampers signed with Lierse until June 2025.

References

External links
 

2001 births
Living people
Belgian footballers
Association football forwards
Cercle Brugge K.S.V. players
Lierse Kempenzonen players
Belgian Pro League players
Challenger Pro League players